Richard Morgan Fliehr (born February 25, 1949), known professionally as Ric Flair, is an American professional wrestler. Regarded by multiple peers and journalists as the greatest professional wrestler of all time, Flair has had a career spanning over 50 years.

He is noted for his tenures with Jim Crockett Promotions (JCP), World Championship Wrestling (WCW), the World Wrestling Federation (WWF, later WWE) and Total Nonstop Action Wrestling (TNA). Much of his career was spent in JCP and WCW, where he won numerous titles. Since the mid-1970s, he has used the moniker "the Nature Boy". A major pay-per-view attraction throughout his career, Flair headlined the premier annual NWA/WCW event, Starrcade, on ten occasions, while also co-headlining its WWF counterpart, WrestleMania, in 1992, after winning that year's Royal Rumble. PWI awarded him their Wrestler of the Year award a record six times, while Wrestling Observer Newsletter named him the Wrestler of the Year (an award named after him and Lou Thesz) a record eight times. The first two-time WWE Hall of Fame inductee, first inducted with the class of 2008 for his individual career and again with the class of 2012 as a member of The Four Horsemen, he is also a member of the NWA Hall of Fame, and the Professional Wrestling Hall of Fame.

Flair is officially recognized by WWE as a 16-time world champion (8-time NWA World Heavyweight Champion, 6-time WCW World Heavyweight Champion, and two-time WWF Champion), although the number of his world championship reigns varies by source, ranging from 16 to 25. He has claimed to be a 21-time champion. He was the first holder of the WCW World Heavyweight Championship and the WCW International World Heavyweight Championship (which he also held last). As the inaugural WCW World Heavyweight Champion, he became the first person to complete WCW's Triple Crown, having already held the United States Heavyweight and World Tag Team Championships. He then completed WWE's version of the Triple Crown when he won the Intercontinental Championship, after already holding the WWF Championship and the World Tag Team Championship.

Early life 
Fliehr was born on February 25, 1949, in Memphis, Tennessee. His original parents were Luther and Olive Phillips, the latter of whom was also credited with the Demaree and Stewart surnames; nevertheless, his birth name is commonly considered to be Fred Phillips, even if he is also credited on various records as Fred Demaree or Fred Stewart. He was adopted by Kathleen Kinsmiller Fliehr (1918–2003) and Richard Reid Fliehr (1918–2000). The Fliehrs decided to adopt due to Kathleen being unable to become pregnant after giving birth to a daughter who died shortly after. At the time of his adoption (arranged by the Tennessee Children's Home Society as part of Georgia Tann's baby-kidnapping operation), his adoptive father was completing a residency in obstetrics and gynecology in Detroit, Michigan. His adoptive mother worked for the Star Tribune. Shortly afterward, the family settled in Edina, Minnesota, where the young Fliehr lived throughout his childhood. After ninth grade, he attended Wayland Academy in Beaver Dam, Wisconsin for four years, during which time he participated in interscholastic wrestling, football, and track. After high school, Fliehr briefly attended the University of Minnesota.

Professional wrestling career

American Wrestling Association (1972–1974) 
A successful amateur wrestler in his teens, Flair trained as a professional wrestler with Verne Gagne. He attended Gagne's first wrestling camp with Greg Gagne, "Jumpin'" Jim Brunzell, The Iron Sheik and Ken Patera at Gagne's barn outside Minneapolis in the winter of 1971. On December 10, 1972, he made his debut in Rice Lake, Wisconsin, battling George "Scrap Iron" Gadaski to a 10-minute draw while adopting the ring name Ric Flair. During his time in the American Wrestling Association (AWA), Flair had matches with Dusty Rhodes, Chris Taylor, André the Giant, Larry Hennig and Wahoo McDaniel.

International Wrestling Enterprise (1973) 
Flair made his first appearances in Japan in 1973 with International Wrestling Enterprise (IWE) as part of a working agreement between the IWE and AWA promoter Verne Gagne. He competed in IWE's "Big Summer Series" throughout June and July, facing opponents such as Animal Hamaguchi, Great Kusatsu, Katsuzo Matsumoto, Mighty Inoue, and Rusher Kimura.

Jim Crockett Promotions / World Championship Wrestling (1974–1991)

Becoming the Nature Boy (1974–1981) 

In 1974, Flair left the AWA for Jim Crockett's Mid-Atlantic region in the National Wrestling Alliance (NWA) and he soon captured his first singles title, when on February 9, 1975, he beat Paul Jones for the Mid-Atlantic TV Championship. On October 4, 1975, however, Flair's career nearly ended when he was in a serious plane crash in Wilmington, North Carolina that took the life of the pilot and paralyzed Johnny Valentine (also on board were Mr. Wrestling, Bob Bruggers, and promoter David Crockett). Flair broke his back in three places and, at age 26, was told by doctors that he would never wrestle again. Flair conducted a rigorous physical therapy schedule, however, and he returned to the ring just three months later, where he resumed his feud with Wahoo McDaniel in January 1976. The crash did force Flair to alter his wrestling technique away from the power brawling style he had used early on to one more focused on grappling, which led him to adopt the "Nature Boy" gimmick he would use throughout his career. Flair won the NWA United States Heavyweight Championship when he defeated Bobo Brazil on July 29, 1977, in Richmond, Virginia. During the next three years, he held five reigns as NWA United States Heavyweight Champion while feuding with Ricky Steamboat, Roddy Piper, Mr. Wrestling, Jimmy Snuka and Greg Valentine (with whom he also formed a championship tag team). However, Flair reached elite status when he began referring to himself as "The Nature Boy" in order to incite a 1978 feud with the original "Nature Boy" Buddy Rogers, who put Flair over in one encounter.

NWA World Heavyweight Champion (1981–1991) 

On September 17, 1981, Flair beat Dusty Rhodes for his first NWA World Heavyweight Championship. In the following years, Flair established himself as the promotion's main franchise in the midst of emerging competition from Vince McMahon's World Wrestling Federation (WWF). An unsanctioned title loss took place on January 6, 1983, to Carlos Colón Sr. in Puerto Rico. Flair recovered the championship belt in a phantom change seventeen days later not officially recognized by the NWA. Harley Race won the NWA World Heavyweight Championship from Flair in 1983, but Flair regained the title at Starrcade in a steel cage match. Officially, Flair won the NWA World Heavyweight Championship eight more times. Flair lost the title to Race and won it back in the span of three days in New Zealand and Singapore in March 1984. At the first David Von Erich Memorial Parade of Champions at Texas Stadium, Flair was pinned by Kerry Von Erich, but he regained the title eighteen days later in Japan and reigned for two years, two months and two days, losing the title to Dusty Rhodes on July 26, 1986, at The Great American Bash in a Steel Cage Match. However, Flair regained the title at a house show on August 9, when Rhodes passed out in the Figure Four leglock.

In late 1985, the tag team of Arn Anderson and Ole Anderson began aiding Flair (whom they claimed as a "cousin") in attacks against Dusty Rhodes, Magnum T.A. and Sam Houston. A few weeks later, the Andersons interrupted Houston's match against Tully Blanchard and the three villains combined to rough up the youngster. Shortly thereafter, Flair, Blanchard and the Andersons formalized their alliance, calling themselves The Four Horsemen, with Blanchard's manager J. J. Dillon also coming on board. Upon the group's inception, it was clear that The Four Horsemen were unlike any villainous alliance that had ever existed, as the four rule breakers immediately used their strength in numbers to decimate the NWA's top fan favorites (most famously a vicious beatdown to Rhodes with a baseball bat in a parking lot) while controlling the majority of the championship titles.

By 1986, wrestling promoter Jim Crockett had consolidated the various NWA member promotions he owned into a single entity, running under the banner of the National Wrestling Alliance. Controlling much of the traditional NWA territories in the southeast and Midwestern United States, Crockett looked to expand nationally and built his promotion around Flair as champion. During this time, Flair's bookings as champion were tightly controlled by Crockett, and a custom championship belt was created for Flair. Flair lost the NWA World Heavyweight Championship in Detroit to Ron Garvin on September 25, 1987. Garvin held the title for two months before losing to Flair on November 26, 1987, at WCW's first pay-per-view event, Starrcade, in Chicago.In early 1988, Sting and Flair fought to a 45-minute time-limit draw at the first ever Clash of the Champions. On February 20, 1989, at Chi-Town Rumble in Chicago, Ricky Steamboat pinned Flair to win the NWA World Heavyweight Championship. This prompted a series of rematches, where Steamboat was presented as a "family man" (often accompanied by his wife and young son), while Flair opposed him as an immoral, fast-living "ladies man". Following a best-of-three falls match with Steamboat that lasted just short of the 60-minute time limit (and ended with a disputed finish where Steamboat retained the title) at Clash of the Champions VI: Ragin' Cajun on April 2, Flair regained the title from Steamboat on May 7, 1989, at WrestleWar in a match that was voted 1989's "Match of the Year" by Pro Wrestling Illustrated. On July 23, 1989, Flair defeated Terry Funk at The Great American Bash, but the two continued to feud through the summer and eventually Flair reformed The Four Horsemen, with the surprise addition of longtime rival Sting, to combat Funk's J-Tex Corporation. This led to an "I Quit" match at Clash of the Champions IX: New York Knockout which Flair won. Flair then kicked Sting out of The Four Horsemen upon his challenge for the NWA World Heavyweight Championship, resulting in a revived feud between the two. On July 7, 1990, Flair dropped the title to Sting at The Great American Bash. After being unmasked as The Black Scorpion at Starrcade in 1990, Flair regained the title from Sting on January 11, 1991.

Subsequent to this title win, Flair was recognized by WCW as the first WCW World Heavyweight Champion, though he was still also recognized as NWA World Heavyweight Champion. On March 21, 1991, Tatsumi Fujinami defeated Flair in a match in Tokyo at the WCW/New Japan Supershow. While the NWA recognized Fujinami as their new champion, WCW did not because Fujinami had backdropped Flair over the top rope in a violation of WCW rules. On May 19, 1991, Flair defeated Fujinami at SuperBrawl I in St. Petersburg, Florida to reclaim the NWA World Heavyweight Championship and retain the WCW World Heavyweight Championship. In the spring of 1991, Flair had a contract dispute with WCW president Jim Herd, who wanted him to take a substantial pay cut. Flair had resigned as head booker in February 1990 and Herd wanted to reduce Flair's role in the promotion even further, despite the fact that Flair was still a top draw. According to Flair, Herd also proposed changes in his appearance and ring name (i.e. by shaving his hair, wearing a diamond earring and going by the name Spartacus) in order to "change with the times". Flair disagreed with the proposals and two weeks before The Great American Bash, Herd fired him and vacated the WCW World Heavyweight Championship. While Flair had left for the WWF, he was still recognized as the NWA World Heavyweight Champion until September 8, when the title was officially vacated.

All Japan Pro Wrestling (1978, 1981–1987, 2013) 
While working for Jim Crockett Jr.'s Mid-Atlantic Championship Wrestling (MACW), Flair began working tours for All Japan Pro Wrestling (AJPW). On April 27, 1978, Flair challenged for the NWA United National Championship in a losing effort. Throughout the 1980s, Flair defended the NWA World Heavyweight Championship in All Japan against the likes of Genichiro Tenryu, Riki Choshu, Jumbo Tsuruta, Harley Race, and Kerry Von Erich. On October 21, 1985, Flair wrestled Rick Martel in a double title match where he defended the NWA World Heavyweight Championship and challenged for the AWA World Heavyweight Championship, but the match ended in a double countout. As All Japan withdrew from the National Wrestling Alliance (NWA) in the late 1980s, World Championship Wrestling (WCW) began a working agreement with New Japan Pro-Wrestling (NJPW). In 1989, the working agreement led to a feud between Flair and Keiji Mutoh, who was wrestling under The Great Muta gimmick, in the United States for WCW. On March 21, 1991, Flair defended the NWA World Heavyweight Championship and challenged Tatsumi Fujinami for the IWGP Heavyweight Championship in a double title match on the WCW/New Japan Supershow at the Tokyo Dome. Fujinami beat Flair for the NWA World Heavyweight Championship, but later lost the title at WCW's SuperBrawl I on May 19, 1991, in the United States.

On January 2, 2013, All Japan announced that Flair would make his return to AJPW for the first time in five years on January 26, 2013, teaming with Keiji Mutoh to take on Tatsumi Fujinami and Seiya Sanada. This would have been his first professional wrestling match since his September 2011 loss to Sting on Impact Wrestling and his first for All Japan since March 1987. However, on January 26, just moments before the start of the All Japan event, the promotion announced that Flair was forced to pull out of his match because of a "sudden illness", later reported as a badly swollen left leg. Flair was replaced in the match by his son Reid, but also ended up getting involved in the match himself, delivering chops to Seiya Sanada.

World Wrestling Federation (1991–1993)
Flair signed with the World Wrestling Federation (WWF) in August 1991 and began appearing on television with the Big Gold Belt, calling himself "The Real World's Champion". His first match with the promotion saw him squash Jim Powers on an episode of WWF Wrestling Challenge that aired on September 29. Led by his "financial adviser" Bobby Heenan and his "executive consultant" Mr. Perfect, Flair repeatedly issued challenges to WWF wrestlers like "Rowdy" Roddy Piper and Hulk Hogan, wrestling a team led by Piper at Survivor Series in November 1991 and helping The Undertaker defeat Hogan for the WWF Championship that same night. WCW sued Flair in an attempt to reclaim the championship belt, but Flair claimed otherwise due to a loophole in NWA policy; at the time he first became champion, the NWA required all of the wrestlers that it selected to be world champion to put down a security deposit of $25,000, which, in effect, resulted in the belt being leased to any wrestler who held it. The NWA, in usual cases, would return the deposit and any interest that may have accumulated upon the conclusion of the wrestler's championship reign. They did not do this for Flair before he was terminated by WCW, and since the money was still owed to him by the NWA upon his signing with the WWF, Flair believed that the title belt had become his personal property to do with as he pleased.

At the 1992 Royal Rumble, Flair won the Rumble match to claim the vacant WWF Championship. Flair entered as number three in the Rumble match and lasted 60 minutes, last eliminating Sid Justice with help from Hulk Hogan, who had been eliminated by Justice seconds earlier. In February 1992, Flair faced WWF Intercontinental Champion Roddy Piper in a series of inconclusive title-versus-title matches. Randy Savage then challenged Flair for the WWF Championship as part of the double main event at WrestleMania VIII. In the storyline, Flair taunted Savage by claiming that he had a prior relationship with Savage's wife, Miss Elizabeth. Savage defeated Flair for the title at WrestleMania. In July 1992, as Savage prepared to defend the title against The Ultimate Warrior at SummerSlam, Flair and Mr. Perfect sowed distrust between the two by suggesting that they would back one or the other during their match. They actually attacked both Savage and Warrior, resulting in the latter winning by countout, and injured Savage's knee, an injury that Flair exploited to regain the title in a match with Savage three days later on September 1 in Hershey, Pennsylvania. On September 15, 1992, Flair defended the WWF Championship against Genichiro Tenryu at a Wrestle Association R event in Yokohama, Japan; the match ended in a draw. Flair's second reign ended when he lost the title to Bret Hart on October 12, 1992, at a house show.

Flair teamed with Razor Ramon to take on Savage and Perfect at the Survivor Series in November 1992. Flair appeared in the Royal Rumble in January 1993, then lost a Loser Leaves the WWF match to Mr. Perfect on the next night's (January 25, 1993) Monday Night Raw in a match taped six days earlier. Flair had a verbal agreement with Vince McMahon with the condition that if he wasn't going to be used in a main event position and had an offer to go elsewhere, he would be released from his contract. He opted to leave WWF when he was going to be moved to a mid-card position and Bill Watts offered to come back to WCW. Flair then fulfilled his remaining house show commitments and took part in the WWF's "Winter Tour '93" of Europe. He made his last appearance with the WWF on February 11, 1993, before returning to WCW.

Super World of Sports (1992) 
In April 1992, Flair toured Japan with the Super World of Sports (SWS) promotion as part of an agreement between the WWF and SWS. In his first bout, he teamed with The Natural Disasters to defeat Ashura Hara, Genichiro Tenryu, and Takashi Ishikawa in a six-man tag team match. He went on to defeat Tenryu in a singles match, then lost to Tenryu in a two-out-of-three falls match.

World Championship Wrestling (1993–2001)

WCW World Heavyweight Champion (1993–1996) 

Flair triumphantly returned to WCW as a hero in February 1993. As a result of a "no-compete" clause he was initially unable to wrestle, so he hosted a short-lived talk show in WCW called A Flair for the Gold. Arn Anderson usually appeared at the bar on the show's set, and Flair's maid Fifi cleaned or bore gifts. Once he returned to action, Flair briefly held the NWA World Heavyweight Championship for a tenth time after defeating Barry Windham at Beach Blast before WCW finally left the NWA in September 1993. At Fall Brawl, Flair lost the title, now rebranded the WCW International World Heavyweight Championship, to "Ravishing Rick" Rude. At Starrcade in 1993, Flair defeated Vader to win the WCW World Heavyweight title for the second time. In the spring of 1994, Flair began a tweener turn and started another feud with longtime rival Ricky Steamboat and challenged Steamboat to a match at Spring Stampede which ended in a no contest from a double pin, causing the title to be held up. Flair then defeated Steamboat in a rematch to reclaim the held-up title on an episode of WCW Saturday Night. The WWE does not count this victory as a new title win. Flair then challenged Col. Robert Parker to wrestle one of his men at Slamboree, which turned out to be Barry Windham, whom Flair defeated, afterwards he quietly turned heel and took Sherri Martel as his manager. He would also wrestle Lord Steven Regal in a five-match series under Marquess of Queensberry Rules, which aired on WCW Worldwide between April 30 and May 28, in which Flair won the series, with 2 wins, 1 loss, and 2 draws.

In June 1994 at Clash of the Champions XXVII, Flair defeated Sting in a unification match, merging the WCW International World Heavyweight Championship with the WCW World Heavyweight Championship, and solidifying his heel turn after his alliance with Sherri was brought into the open after she helped him win the match while pretending that she had sided with Sting. After becoming the unified and undisputed WCW champion, Flair feuded with Hulk Hogan upon Hogan's arrival in WCW in June 1994, losing the WCW World Heavyweight Championship to him in July at Bash at the Beach. Flair continued to feud with Hogan and finally lost to Hogan in a steel cage retirement match at Halloween Havoc. Flair took a few months off afterwards before returning to WCW television in January 1995 for an interview at Clash of the Champions XXX. After attacking Hogan at Superbrawl V, Flair also began appearing as a part-time manager for Vader, who was engaged in feud with Hogan, and developed a short-lived angle where he was "possessed," even attacking his old WWF opponent Randy Savage at the first Uncensored. He soon afterwards returned to wrestling.(explained on-air by having Flair nag Hogan for months until Hogan and Savage both petitioned WCW management to let Flair come back). Upon returning to wrestling, Flair quickly revived his 1992 feud with Savage, but this time also got Savage's father Angelo Poffo involved after he put him in a figure four leglock at Slamboree 1995.

On April 29, 1995, Flair wrestled Antonio Inoki in front of 190,000 spectators in Pyongyang, North Korea at the May Day Stadium in a losing effort under a joint show between New Japan Pro-Wrestling and World Championship Wrestling. The event was broadcast on August 4, 1995, on pay-per-view under the title of Collision in Korea. In the fall of 1995, Flair began a short feud with Arn Anderson, which culminated in a tag match that saw Flair turning on Sting to reform the new Four Horsemen with Flair as the leader, Arn Anderson, Brian Pillman, and Chris Benoit as the members. With the new Four Horsemen, Flair won the WCW World Heavyweight Championship two more times before the nWo invasion storyline began in WCW, with the first one being in December 1995 at Starrcade, where Flair defeated Lex Luger and Sting by countout and then defeated Savage after all three Four Horsemen members ran to the ring and Arn Anderson knocked out Savage with brass knuckles, thus allowing Flair to pin Savage to win the match and the title. Afterwards Savage won the title back on Nitro after Starcade, but Flair won the next match at SuperBrawl VI to regain the championship. During the feud, Savage's manager Miss Elizabeth turned against him and became Flair's valet. Together with Woman and Debra McMichael they would escort Flair to his matches until Miss Elizabeth was taken by the nWo in the fall and eventually returned as Savage's valet when he joined the nWo in 1997. Flair lost the WCW World Heavyweight Championship eventually three months later to The Giant. The feud with Savage continued with The New Four Horseman joining the Dungeon of Doom to create an Alliance to end Hulkamania. Together the factions wrestled Hogan and Savage in a triple steel cage, End of Hulkamania match; losing to the reunited Mega Powers. Afterwards, Flair went on to win the WCW United States Heavyweight Championship and there were also changes in the Four Horseman in 1996, as Brian Pillman left WCW and Steve "Mongo" McMichael became the fourth member.

Feud with the New World Order (1996–1999) 

Once again as a top fan favorite, Flair played a major role in the New World Order (nWo) invasion storyline in late 1996 and throughout 1997. He and the other Horsemen often took the lead in the war against Scott Hall, Kevin Nash, and Hollywood Hulk Hogan, whom Flair immediately challenged for the WCW World Heavyweight Championship at the Clash of the Champions XXXIII, but won only by disqualification. In September 1996, Flair and Anderson teamed with their bitter rivals, Sting and Lex Luger, to lose to the nWo (Hogan, Kevin Nash, Scott Hall, and an impostor Sting) in the WarGames match at Fall Brawl when Luger submitted to the impostor Sting's Scorpion Deathlock.

In October 1996, two developments occurred that affected the Four Horsemen when Jeff Jarrett came over to WCW from the WWF, and expressed his desire to join the Horsemen as he immediately gained a fan in Ric Flair, much to the chagrin of the other Horsemen. Flair finally let Jarrett join the group in February 1997, but the others did not want him, and in July 1997 was ultimately kicked out of the group by Flair himself, who had enough of the instability Jarrett's presence caused the Horsemen. Flair also feuded with Roddy Piper, Syxx, and his old nemesis Curt Hennig in 1997, after Hennig was offered a spot in The Four Horsemen only to turn on Flair and The Four Horsemen at Fall Brawl in September 1997, in which Hennig punctuated the act by slamming the cage door onto Flair's head.

In April 1998, Flair disappeared from WCW television, due to a lawsuit filed by Eric Bischoff for no-showing a live episode of Thunder on April 9, 1998, in Tallahassee, Florida. After the case was settled, Flair made a surprise return on September 14, 1998, to ceremoniously reform the Four Horsemen (along with Steve McMichael, Dean Malenko, and Chris Benoit). Flair feuded with Bischoff for several months afterward. Flair repeatedly raked Eric Bischoff's eyes during this feud. This culminated in a match at Starrcade between Bischoff and Flair in December 1998, which Bischoff won after interference from Curt Hennig, a former member of the Four Horsemen. The following night in Baltimore on Nitro, Flair returned and threatened to leave WCW, demanding a match against Bischoff for the presidency of the company. The match was made, and despite the nWo interfering on Bischoff's behalf Flair won and was granted the position of president of WCW. This resulted in a match at SuperBrawl IX between Flair and Hollywood Hogan for the WCW World Heavyweight Championship, which Flair lost after being betrayed by his own son David Flair.

Final world championship reigns (1999–2001) 

In spite of his son's betrayal, Flair signed a rematch at Uncensored which was billed as a First Blood barbed wire steel cage Match against Hogan where Flair's presidency and Hogan's WCW World Heavyweight Championship were on the line. Despite being the first to bleed, Flair won the match by pinfall thanks to the bias of the referee Charles Robinson, who counted Hogan out.

As on-air WCW President, Flair began abusing his power much like Bischoff had, favoring villains over fan favorites and even awarding the WCW United States Heavyweight Championship (which was vacated by Scott Steiner due to injury) to his son David and resorting to whatever means necessary to keep him as United States Heavyweight Champion. Flair eventually formed a stable of followers which included Roddy Piper, Arn Anderson and the Jersey Triad to keep things in order. Flair's reign as president came to an end on the July 19 episode of Nitro, when he faced and lost to Sting for the position. During the course of the match, Sting had Flair in his Scorpion Death Lock, but with the referee knocked unconscious, no decision could be reached. A returning Eric Bischoff came to the ring and began ordering the timekeeper to ring the bell, which he eventually did, awarding the match and the presidency to Sting (who promptly gave it up upon receiving it).

Flair won his last world titles in his career by winning the WCW World Heavyweight Championship twice during 2000, the company's last full year of operation. When WCW was purchased by the WWF in March 2001, Flair was the leader of the villainous group called the Magnificent Seven. Flair lost the final match of Nitro to Sting, recreating the second match of Nitro in 1995. Nevertheless, Flair has repeatedly stated in various interviews how happy he was when WCW finally closed down, although at the same time the fact that many people would lose their jobs saddened him.

New Japan Pro-Wrestling (1995, 1996) 
In August 1995, while under WCW contract, Flair participated in the G1 Climax tournament in New Japan Pro-Wrestling (NJPW), where he beat Shiro Koshinaka, drew Masahiro Chono, and lost to Keiji Mutoh. On July 17, 1996, Flair challenged Shinya Hashimoto for the IWGP Heavyweight Championship in a losing effort in NJPW.

World Wrestling Federation / World Wrestling Entertainment (2001–2009)

WWF co-owner (2001–2002) 

After an eight-month hiatus from wrestling, Flair made a return to the WWF on November 19, 2001. Flair reappeared on Raw following the end of the "WCW/ECW Invasion" that culminated in a "Winner Take All" match at Survivor Series won by the WWF. Flair's new on-screen role was that of the co-owner of the WWF, with the explanation that Shane and Stephanie McMahon had sold their stock in the company to a consortium (namely Flair) prior to purchasing World Championship Wrestling and Extreme Championship Wrestling. Flair's feud with Vince McMahon led them to a match at the Royal Rumble in January 2002 in a Street Fight, where Flair defeated McMahon. Flair also wrestled The Undertaker at WrestleMania X8 in March 2002 where Flair lost. The "co-owner" angle culminated in early 2002, when Flair controlled Raw and McMahon controlled SmackDown!

On the May 13 episode of Raw, Flair challenged Hollywood Hulk Hogan to a no disqualification match for the Undisputed WWE Championship. Flair would later lose the contest before moving onto a rivalry with Stone Cold Steve Austin. At Judgment Day, Flair teamed with Big Show and lost to Austin in a two-on-one handicap tag team match. On the June 3 episode of Raw, the feud between Flair and Austin would escalate after Austin defeated Flair in a singles contest. After Austin abruptly left the WWE in June while in a program with Flair, a match was hotshotted between Flair and McMahon for sole ownership of WWE, which Flair lost after interference from Brock Lesnar on the June 10 edition of Raw.

At King of the Ring, Flair defeated Eddie Guerrero in a singles match after Guerrero and Chris Benoit would interrupt Flair's speech regarding losing his position as WWE co-owner; afterwards, Guerrero would lock Flair in his own signature figure four leg lock with help from Benoit. Flair's rivalry with Lesnar would continue into the month of July with Lesnar picking up wins over Flair in a singles match on the July 1 episode of Raw and in a tag team contest on the July 15 episode of Raw. Flair then became involved in a short-lived rivalry with Chris Jericho, leading to Flair defeating Jericho at SummerSlam. Flair was granted a World Heavyweight Championship match against Triple H on the September 2 episode of Raw, which he lost. Later on that same night, Flair would team with Rob Van Dam as the duo were successful in defeating the team of Triple H and Jericho. At Unforgiven, Flair was unsuccessful in capturing the WWE Intercontinental Championship in a singles contest against Jericho.

Under the WWE banner, Flair toured Japan periodically between 2002 and 2008. He successfully defended the World Tag Team Championship with Batista against The Dudley Boyz twice in February 2004. On the February 7, 2005 episode of Raw, broadcast from the Saitama Super Arena in Japan, Flair lost to Shawn Michaels in a singles match. In February 2008, Flair wrestled Mr. Kennedy in the Ariake Coliseum and William Regal in the Budokan Hall, both under the stipulation that he would retire if he lost.

Evolution (2002–2005) 

In September 2002 at Unforgiven, Triple H defended the World Heavyweight Championship against Rob Van Dam. During the match, Flair came down to the ring and grabbed the sledgehammer from Triple H and teased hitting him before hitting Van Dam, allowing Triple H to get the win, turning him heel in the process and accompanied Triple H to the ring as his manager. Shortly after, Batista moved from SmackDown! to Raw and Flair also began accompanying him to the ring while continuing to second Triple H. In June 2003 at Bad Blood, Flair was able to defeat Shawn Michaels after Orton struck Michaels with a chair.

At the height of Evolution's power, the group controlled all of the male-based championships of Raw after Armageddon. Batista teamed with Flair to win the World Tag Team Championship from the Dudley Boyz (Bubba Ray Dudley and D-Von Dudley) in a tag team turmoil match and Triple H regained the World Heavyweight Championship from Goldberg (in a triple threat match that also involved Kane), with the help of the other members of Evolution. In January 2004 at the Royal Rumble, Flair and Batista successfully defended the World Tag Team Championship against the Dudley Boyz in a tables match, and World Heavyweight Champion Triple H fought Shawn Michaels to no contest in a Last Man Standing match, thus retaining the championship. Flair and Batista lost the World Tag Team Championship on February 16 edition of Raw to Booker T and Rob Van Dam. At WrestleMania XX, Evolution defeated the Rock 'n' Sock Connection (The Rock and Mick Foley) in a 3-on-2 handicap match. The following week on Raw during the 2004 WWE draft lottery, Flair and Batista defeated Booker T and Rob Van Dam to win their second and final World Tag Team Championship, but they lost the titles to World Heavyweight Champion Chris Benoit and Edge on the April 19 episode of Raw.

At SummerSlam, Orton pinned Benoit to become the new World Heavyweight Champion and the youngest World Champion in WWE history to date. On the episode of Raw the night after SummerSlam, Batista hoisted Orton on to his shoulders in what appeared to be a celebration, but following the thumbs down from Triple H, the group proceeded to attack Orton. At Unforgiven, Triple H beat Orton to regain the World Heavyweight Championship, with help from Flair, Batista, and Jonathan Coachman. Orton's feud with Evolution continued until Survivor Series where Triple H, Batista, Gene Snitsky, and Edge were defeated by Orton, Maven, Chris Jericho, and Chris Benoit in a Survivor Series match for control of Raw over the following month.

In the Elimination Chamber match at New Year's Revolution, Batista, Orton and Triple H were the last three remaining in the match. Orton eliminated Batista with a RKO and Triple H pinned Orton with Batista's help to win the title. Triple H suggested that Batista not enter the Royal Rumble match, wanting the group to focus on Triple H retaining the title. At the Royal Rumble, Batista declined, entered the Rumble at number 28 and won. Triple H tried to persuade Batista to challenge the WWE Champion John "Bradshaw" Layfield of SmackDown! rather than for his World Heavyweight Championship. This involved Triple H plotting a feud between JBL and Batista, showing JBL badmouthing Batista in an interview and staging an attack on Batista with a limousine designed to look like Layfield's. The scheme was unsuccessful and at the brand contract signing ceremony on the February 21 episode of Raw, Batista chose to remain on Raw, infuriating Triple H and thus quitting the faction. Batista defeated Triple H for the World Heavyweight Championship at WrestleMania 21. Flair and Triple H also starred in an ad for WrestleMania 21 that parodied the film Braveheart.

After Vengeance, Triple H took time off and Flair turned face for the first time since 2002 before going on to win the Intercontinental Championship from Carlito at Unforgiven, and the group was dissolved. Triple H returned at the "Homecoming" episode of Raw on October 3 where he was to team with Flair in a tag team match against Carlito and Chris Masters. After winning that match, Triple H betrayed Flair and attacked him with a sledgehammer. Flair retained the Intercontinental Championship against Triple H at Taboo Tuesday in a steel cage match, which was voted as such by the fans. Flair later lost to Triple H in an acclaimed Last Man Standing non-title match at Survivor Series, which ended their feud.

Final storylines and first retirement (2005–2008) 
At the end of 2005, Flair had a feud with Edge that culminated in a WWE Championship Tables, Ladders, and Chairs match on Raw in early 2006, which Flair lost. On the February 20 episode of Raw, Flair lost the Intercontinental Championship to Shelton Benjamin, thus ending his reign at 155 days. Flair took some time off in mid-2006 to rest and marry for the third time and he returned in June to work a program with his real-life rival Mick Foley that played off their legitimate past animosity. Flair defeated Foley at Vengeance in a two out of three falls match, then at SummerSlam in an "I quit" match.

Subsequently, he was involved in a rivalry with the Spirit Squad on Raw. On November 5, 2006, at Cyber Sunday, he captured the World Tag Team Championship from the Spirit Squad with Roddy Piper. On the November 13 episode of Raw, Flair and Piper lost the World Tag Team Championship to Rated-RKO, due to a disc problem with Piper and had to be flown immediately back to the United States as soon as Raw was off the air. On November 26, 2006, at Survivor Series, Flair was the sole survivor of a match that featured himself, Ron Simmons (replacing an injured Piper), Dusty Rhodes and Sgt. Slaughter versus the Spirit Squad.

Flair then began teaming with Carlito after Flair said that Carlito had no heart. Flair defeated Carlito in a match after which Carlito realized that Flair was right. Flair and Carlito faced off against Lance Cade and Trevor Murdoch in a number one contender's match for the World Tag Team Championship but were defeated. The two teamed up on the WrestleMania 23 pre-show, and defeated the team of Chavo Guerrero and Gregory Helms. After weeks of conflict between Flair and Carlito, the team split up when Carlito attacked Flair during a match on the April 30 episode of Raw. At Judgment Day, Flair defeated Carlito with the figure four leglock.

On the June 11 episode of Raw, Flair was drafted to the SmackDown! brand as part of the 2007 WWE draft. He briefly feuded against Montel Vontavious Porter, unsuccessfully challenging him for the WWE United States Championship at Vengeance: Night of Champions. Flair rejoined forces with Batista to feud with The Great Khali; the alliance was short-lived, however, as Flair was "injured" during a match with Khali on the August 3 episode of SmackDown!.

After a three-month hiatus, Flair returned to WWE programming on the November 26 episode of Raw to announce "I will never retire". Vince McMahon retaliated by announcing that the next match Flair lost would result in a forced retirement. Later in the night, Flair defeated Orton after a distraction by Chris Jericho. It was revealed on the 15th anniversary of Raw that the win or retire ultimatum only applied in singles matches. Flair won several "career threatening" matches against the opponents such as Triple H, Umaga, William Regal, Mr. Kennedy, and Vince McMahon himself among others. On March 29, 2008, Flair was inducted into the WWE Hall of Fame as a part of the class of 2008 by Triple H. The day after, Flair wrestled at WrestleMania XXIV in Orlando, Florida, losing to Shawn Michaels. The match was lauded by fans and critics and was voted the 2008 Pro Wrestling Illustrated (PWI) Match of the Year. Flair's fight to keep his career going garnered him the 2008 PWI "Most Inspirational Wrestler of the Year" award.

Part-time appearances (2008–2009) 

On the March 31, 2008 episode of Raw, Flair delivered his farewell address. Afterward, Triple H brought out many current and retired superstars to thank Flair for all he had done, including Shawn Michaels, some of the Four Horsemen, Ricky Steamboat, Harley Race, and Chris Jericho, followed by The Undertaker and then Vince McMahon. Along with the wrestlers, the fans gave Flair a standing ovation. This event represented a rare moment in WWE as both the heels and the faces broke character and came out to the ring together. Flair made his first post retirement appearance on the June 16, 2008 episode of Raw to confront Chris Jericho about his actions during a rivalry with Shawn Michaels. He challenged Jericho to a fight in the parking lot, rather than an official match, but Jericho was stopped by Triple H.

The following year on February 9, Flair once again confronted Jericho on Raw. Jericho was attacking Hall of Fame members and Flair demanded he respect them, before punching Jericho. Flair appeared a month later to distract him during a Money in the Bank Qualifying Match. Jericho then challenged Flair to come out of retirement for WrestleMania 25; instead Flair managed Roddy Piper, Jimmy Snuka and Ricky Steamboat in a three-on-one handicap match at WrestleMania in a losing effort. On May 17, Flair returned during the Judgment Day pay-per-view, coming to the aid of Batista, who was being attacked by The Legacy (Randy Orton, Cody Rhodes and Ted DiBiase). On the June 1 episode of Raw, Flair challenged Orton in a parking lot brawl match, and after interference from the rest of The Legacy, the fight ended with Flair trapped inside a steel cage and punted by Orton.

Ring of Honor and the Hulkamania Tour (2009) 

Flair signed with Ring of Honor (ROH) and appeared at the Stylin' And Profilin event in March 2009, clearing the ring after an ROH World Championship match ended with a run-in. He soon served as the company's ambassador, in an on-screen authority role, and appeared on the television show Ring of Honor Wrestling in May to cement his role. After a number one contender's match ended in a time-limit draw, and the following week a double count out, Flair announced Ring of Honor Wrestling's first ROH World Title match as a four-way contest.

On November 21, 2009, Flair returned to the ring as a villain on the "Hulkamania: Let The Battle Begin" tour of Australia, losing to Hulk Hogan in the main event of the first show by brass knuckles. Hogan defeated Flair again on November 24 in Perth, Australia after both men bled heavily. Flair also lost to Hogan on the two remaining matches on the tour.

 Total Nonstop Action Wrestling (2010–2012) 
Debut and Fortune (2010)

On the January 4, 2010 episode of Total Nonstop Action Wrestling's (TNA) Impact!, Flair made his debut appearance for the company arriving via limo and later observing the main event between A.J. Styles and longtime rival Kurt Angle. It was later reported that Flair had signed a one-year deal with the company. In the past, Flair had openly stated that he was loyal to the McMahons and wanted to end his career in WWE, however he had not had contact from WWE since June 2009 and decided to sign with TNA Wrestling after waiting for the call from WWE for six months. On January 17 at Genesis, Flair helped Styles cheat to pin Angle and retain the TNA World Heavyweight Championship.

In addition to Styles, Flair began informally managing Beer Money, Inc. (Robert Roode and James Storm) and Desmond Wolfe as a loose alliance. On the March 8 episode of Impact!, Hulk Hogan and Abyss defeated Flair and Styles when Abyss pinned Styles. Afterwards, the returning Jeff Hardy saved Abyss and Hogan from a beatdown at the hands of Flair, Styles and Beer Money, Inc. At Lockdown, Team Flair (Ric Flair, Sting, Desmond Wolfe, Robert Roode and James Storm) was defeated by Team Hogan (Hulk Hogan, Abyss, Jeff Jarrett, Jeff Hardy and Rob Van Dam) in a Lethal Lockdown match. On the April 26 episode of Impact!, Flair was defeated by Abyss in a match where Flair's and Hogan's WWE Hall of Fame rings were at stake, and as a result Flair lost possession of his ring to Hogan. The following week, Hogan gave the ring to Jay Lethal, who returned it to Flair out of respect. This, however, was not enough for Flair, who attacked Lethal along with the members of Team Flair. After Styles dropped the TNA World Heavyweight Championship to Rob Van Dam, then failed to regain it in a rematch and later was pinned by Jay Lethal, Flair adopted Kazarian as his newest protégé, seemingly replacing Styles as his number one wrestler.

On the June 17 episode of Impact!, Flair announced that he would reform the Four Horsemen under the new name , a group consisting of A.J. Styles, Kazarian, Robert Roode, James Storm, and Desmond Wolfe. Flair made a return to the ring on July 11 at Victory Road, losing to Jay Lethal. On the August 5 episode of Impact!, Flair faced Lethal in a rematch, this time contested under Street Fight rules, with the members of  banned from ringside; Flair managed to win the match after an interference from Douglas Williams. In the weeks leading to Bound for Glory, Flair's stable's name was tweaked to Fortune to represent the expansion in the number of members in the group. On the October 7 episode of Impact!, Flair was defeated by Mick Foley in a Last Man Standing match.

Immortal and second retirement (2010–2012)

On the following episode of Impact!, Fortune formed an alliance with Hulk Hogan's and Eric Bischoff's new stable, Immortal. On the November 18 episode of Impact!, Flair returned to the ring, competing in a match where he faced Matt Morgan, who had been kicked out of Fortune the previous month; Morgan won the match after Douglas Williams turned on the rest of Fortune, when they interfered in the match. On January 25, 2011, it was reported that Flair had pulled out of TNA's Maximum Wooo! tour of Europe mid–tour after monetary disputes. After missing a show in Berlin, Germany, Flair returned to the tour on January 27 in Glasgow, Scotland, reportedly apologizing to the locker room prior to the show. On January 29, Flair wrestled his only match of the tour, defeating Douglas Williams in London, tearing his rotator cuff in the process making it his last singles win. During Flair's time away from TNA, Fortune turned on Immortal. Flair returned at the February 14 tapings of the February 17 episode of Impact!, turning on Fortune during a match between A.J. Styles and Matt Hardy and jumping to Immortal. On the March 10 episode of Impact!, Flair defeated Styles and Hardy in a three–way street fight, contested as more of a two–on–one handicap match. On April 17 at Lockdown, Immortal, represented by Flair, Abyss, Bully Ray and Matt Hardy, was defeated by Fortune members James Storm, Kazarian and Robert Roode and Christopher Daniels, who replaced an injured A.J. Styles, in a Lethal Lockdown match, when Flair tapped out to Roode. The match was used to write Flair off television, as the following week he was scheduled to undergo surgery for his torn rotator cuff; however, Flair ultimately chose not to have the surgery as it would have required six months of rehab.

Flair returned to television in a non–wrestling role on the May 12, 2011 episode of Impact Wrestling. Flair did not appear again for three months, until making his return on August 9 at the tapings of the August 18 episode of Impact Wrestling, confronting old rival Sting and challenging him to one more match. In exchange for Sting agreeing to put his career on the line, Flair promised to deliver him his match with Hogan if he was victorious. The match, which Flair lost, took place on the September 15 episode of Impact Wrestling. The match with Sting would be the last of his career to date. During the match, Flair tore his left triceps on a superplex spot, sidelining him indefinitely from in-ring action. At Bound for Glory, Flair appeared in Hogan's corner in his match against Sting. Flair continued to make appearances for TNA until April 2012. In April 2012, Flair tried to have his TNA contract terminated, which led to TNA filing a lawsuit against WWE for contract tampering and eventually firing Flair on May 11. Having been inactive since his September 2011 injury, Flair announced in a December 3, 2012 interview that he would never wrestle again, owing chiefly to an on-air heart attack suffered by age peer Jerry Lawler following a Raw match three months earlier.

 Return to WWE (2012–2021) 
On March 31, 2012, while still contracted to TNA as a part of a deal with WWE which allowed Christian Cage to appear at Slammiversary 10, Flair became the first person to be inducted into the WWE Hall of Fame twice, the second time as part of the class of 2012 with The Four Horsemen. On December 17, 2012, Flair returned to WWE as a non-wrestling personality on the annual Slammy Awards show to present the Superstar of the Year award to John Cena, who in turn gave the award to Flair. Flair's return was interrupted by CM Punk and Paul Heyman, escalating into a confrontation that ended with him locking Heyman in the figure-four leglock. After clearing the ring, Flair was assaulted by The Shield (Dean Ambrose, Roman Reigns, and Seth Rollins), until Ryback and Team Hell No (Kane and Daniel Bryan) helped Flair fend off the group. Flair appeared on the main roster sporadically throughout 2013, as The Miz's mentor. He also occasionally appeared on NXT in 2013 and 2014, accompanying his daughter Charlotte to the ring.

Flair appeared on April 28, 2014, episode of Raw, alongside the reunited Evolution (minus Flair) and The Shield; Flair showed his endorsement for The Shield, Evolution's opponents at Extreme Rules, effectively turning his back on his old teammates. At Battleground, John Cena symbolically handed over his World Heavyweight Championship belt to Flair, telling him to "take it" while promoting his match. On the post-SummerSlam Raw in August 2015, Flair interrupted Jon Stewart, who had saved Flair's 16 world title record by preventing Cena's victory the previous night, telling him that the record would be broken eventually and he would rather it be by someone who he respects.

Flair began making more frequent appearances with Charlotte after she won the Divas Championship. In January 2016, Flair and Charlotte began displaying villainous traits, with Flair often getting involved in Charlotte's Divas Championship and later WWE Women's Championship defenses, thus turning heel for the first time since 2005 in WWE. This lasted until the May 23 episode of Raw when Charlotte turned on him. On the November 28 episode of Raw, Flair returned to congratulate the new Raw Women's Champion Sasha Banks, who had defeated Charlotte to win the title, thus turning face once again. Flair made a surprise appearance during the November 14, 2017 episode of SmackDown to congratulate his daughter Charlotte Flair, who won the SmackDown Women's Championship. They shared an emotional moment on the ramp and did his iconic strut.

On the February 25, 2019 episode of Raw, WWE celebrated Flair's 70th birthday and during the closing moments, Flair was attacked by Batista. The actual "attack" was never seen, only Flair being dragged by Batista. At WrestleMania 35, Flair assisted Triple H in defeating Batista, to keep his in-ring career going. Flair appeared on the July 22 Raw Reunion episode and raised a toast alongside Triple H, Hulk Hogan, "Stone Cold" Steve Austin, and various other fellow wrestlers of his era. In June 2020, Flair came back to WWE programming as a heel again, managing Randy Orton for a few weeks until the August 10 episode of Raw when Orton performed a punt kick on Flair's head. On November 22, 2020, he made an appearance at Survivor Series during The Undertaker's retirement ceremony.

On the January 4, 2021 episode of Raw, Flair started a storyline with Lacey Evans, when during a match against Women's Tag Team Champions Charlotte Flair and Asuka, Evans flirted with Flair. During the following weeks, Flair managed Evans, usually distracting his daughter Charlotte, including a participation in the Women's Royal Rumble. On the February 15 episode of Raw, Evans' real-life pregnancy was announced and incorporated into a storyline with Flair impregnating Lacey. Evans was scheduled to face Asuka for Raw Women's Championship at Elimination Chamber but the match was cancelled due to her pregnancy and the storyline with Flair was cancelled. On August 2, 2021, it was reported by Wrestling Inc. that Flair had asked for and was granted his release from WWE. WWE confirmed his release the following day and considered it effective as of August 3.

 Late career (2021–present) 

On August 14, 2021, at Triplemanía XXIX, Flair made his Lucha Libre AAA Worldwide (AAA) debut by accompanying Charlotte's fiancé Andrade "El Ídolo" to ringside during his match against AAA Mega Champion Kenny Omega. Flair would later get involved in the match by chopping Omega and applying the Figure Four leglock to Omega's second Konnan.

On August 29, 2021, Flair made his return to the NWA at NWA 73. It was his first NWA appearance since 2008 when he was inducted into the NWA Hall of Fame. At NWA 73, Flair thanked the NWA and WWE for several memorable moments and noted the importance of having several companies in the industry.

On May 16, 2022, it was announced that Flair would wrestle his final match on July 31 in Nashville, called Ric Flair's Last Match, finally retiring after nearly five decades in the ring. On July 18, it was announced that Flair would team with his son-in-law Andrade El Ídolo against Jeff Jarrett and Jay Lethal. As part of the promo setting up the match, Lethal attacked Flair over being left out of the match card. Jarrett initially tried to help Flair, but attacked him after he rebuffed him and used expletives against his family. Flair and Andrade would go on to win the match.

Flair later confirmed that he had passed out twice during the Last Match and regretted announcing that it would be his final match. A few days later, he accompanied Andrade during his match against Carlito at the 49th WWC Anniversary show held on August 6, 2022. Flair attempted to interfere before poking Primo Colón when he tried to stop him, causing Carlos Colón to attack him and forcing him to flee. Andrade would go on to lose the match.

During the celebrations for the 50th anniversary of his debut in professional wrestling on September 26, 2022, Flair announced that he would never retire. In January 2023 however he stated that he did not want to wrestle again aside from wanting to redo the Last Match.

 Legacy 

Flair was often popular with the crowd due to his in-ring antics, including rulebreaking (earning him the distinction of being "the dirtiest player in the game"), strutting and his shouting of "Wooooooo!" (Flair got the inspiration from Jerry Lee Lewis' "Great Balls of Fire"). The "Wooo!" yell has since become a tribute to Flair, and is often shouted by the crowd whenever a wrestler performs a knife-edge chop, one of Flair's signature moves. It is also often shouted by the crowd whenever a wrestler utilizes Flair's figure-four leglock finisher.

From the late 1970s, Flair wore ornate fur-lined robes of many colors with sequins during in-ring appearances, and since the early 1980s, his approach to the ring was usually heralded by the playing of the "Dawn" section of Richard Strauss' "Also sprach Zarathustra" (famous for being used in the 1968 motion picture 2001: A Space Odyssey and for the introduction to Elvis Presley's concerts of the 1970s). Flair also described himself as a "limousine-ridin', jet-flyin', kiss stealin', wheelin' dealin', son-of-a-gun (who kissed all the girls worldwide and made em cry)".

On October 19, 1998, it was declared "Ric Flair Day" in Minneapolis, Minnesota by Mayor Sharon Belton and on November 15, 2008, it was declared "Ric Flair Day" in Norfolk, Virginia. On March 24, 2008, Mayor Bob Coble, of Columbia, South Carolina, declared March 24 to be Ric Flair Day in Columbia. Flair also received the key to the city. He received the key to the city of Greensboro, North Carolina on December 5, 2008, to commemorate Flair's victory in a steel cage match against Harley Race at the inaugural Starrcade event. April 18, 2009 was declared "Ric Flair Day" in Charleston, West Virginia and he was presented with the key to the city by the mayor. Also, on June 12, 2009, Flair was presented with the key to the city of Myrtle Beach, South Carolina and, in September, he received the key to the city in Marion County, South Carolina. On July 17, 2010, Flair made a special appearance at Scotland Motors in Laurinburg, North Carolina and received the key to that city, as well.

On the February 18, 2008 episode of Raw, Shawn Michaels announced Flair as the first inductee into the WWE Hall of Fame class of 2008. The induction ceremony took place on March 29, 2008, with Triple H inducting him. This made him the first person to be inducted while still an active competitor. Flair was later inducted into the NWA Hall of Fame in Atlanta, Georgia, but he did not participate in the event. On January 9, 2012, it was announced that the Four Horsemen would be inducted into the WWE Hall of Fame, thus making Flair the first person to have been inducted into the Hall of Fame twice.

On April 15, 2008, Flair was honored in Congress by a representative from North Carolina, Republican Sue Myrick, who praised his career and what he means to the state. On September 29, 2008, it was announced that Flair's signature sequin covered robe that he wore at WrestleMania XXIV, in what was to be his last WWE match, would be placed in the pop culture section of the National Museum of American History in Washington, D.C.

In 1999, a large group of professional wrestling experts, analysts and historians named Flair the greatest NWA World Heavyweight Champion of all time. In 2002, Flair was named the greatest professional wrestler of all time in the book The Top 100 Wrestlers of All Time by John Molinaro, edited by Dave Meltzer and Jeff Marek. in July 2016, Luke Winkie of Sports Illustrated also named Flair the greatest professional wrestler of all time.

Flair's "Wooo" chant has been used throughout pop culture. Rapper Pusha T paid homage to Flair in numerous songs. For example, on the track "Sweet Serenade", he says, "Triple doubles, two hoes and check please (Wooo!), They love me on my Ric Flair shit (Wooo!), In that Phantom like I'm Blair Witch (Wooo!), Who are you to be compared with? (Wooo!)". Atlanta-based rapper Killer Mike also has a track named "Ric Flair". American trap musicians Offset and Metro Boomin paid tribute to Flair in their hit song "Ric Flair Drip". The Battle of Gettysburg Podcast, hosted by battlefield guides and wrestling fans Jim Hessler and Eric Lindblade, often cites Flair's "Wooo" chant as well as other elements of Flair's mystique.

Sports Illustrated ranked Flair first on their 101 greatest wrestlers of all-time list.

 Reaction to later career 
Some have looked unfavorably upon Flair's career from the late-1990s onward. In 1998, wrestler and former WCW colleague Stone Cold Steve Austin said that Flair had reached the "time to hang it up", having not been great for a "long time". John Molinaro of Slam! Sports penned a 1999 article titled, "Ric Flair is tarnishing his legacy"; Molinaro saw Flair as a wrestler whose prestige was "in jeopardy". In 2006, Pro Wrestling Illustrated writer Frank Ingiosi said that Flair had a "personal vendetta against his legend". He nevertheless continued to wrestle until retiring in 2008, at age 59.

Flair would ultimately return to the ring in 2009 and signed to wrestle for TNA the following year, breaking a vow to never again lace up his boots. Wrestler Axl Rotten, NFL writer Adam Rank, and many fans felt that he sullied his legend by continuing to wrestle in TNA. Asked in 2011 if Flair was tainting his prestige, former opponent Shane Douglas was harsher, stating that he had "been tarnishing his legacy since 1990". Also that year, Kevin Eck of The Baltimore Sun criticized the aging Flair for being unable to separate himself from his ostentatious gimmick when not wrestling, and said: "I don't know what's sadder, Ric Flair tarnishing his legacy in the ring or embarrassing himself away from the ring". Asked about Flair in 2015, wrestler The Honky Tonk Man felt that viewers would "remember only the last years of his career", which consist of "bad memories".

Conversely, professional wrestling announcer Jim Ross in 2012 felt that Flair had not tarnished his legacy, observing only "passion and need to earn a living". In 2016, Flair said continuing to wrestle in TNA was the "number one" regret of his career.

 Other media 

Flair has made numerous appearances in television shows. In 1996, Flair, along with other WCW wrestlers, appeared in an episode of Baywatch as themselves. In 2013, Flair made an appearance in Stuff You Should Know, in the episode, "Bacteriopolis", as Dr. Roland Grayson. In 2014, Flair voiced himself in the animated series, Uncle Grandpa, in the episode, "History of Wrestling". In 2011, Flair voiced himself in the animated series, The Cleveland Show, in the episode, "BFFs".

Flair released his autobiography, To Be the Man, on July 6, 2004. The title is taken from one of his catchphrases, "To be the man, you gotta beat the man!".

In 2009, Flair voiced Commander Douglas Hill in the video game Command & Conquer: Red Alert 3 - Uprising.

It was announced on July 8, 2012, that Flair was to appear at Insane Clown Posse's 13th Annual Gathering of the Juggalos weekend as a main stage host who was in charge of announcing the performers. However, his appearance at the event was cut short after his hair was grazed by a water bottle thrown from the crowd before announcing Tech N9ne to enter the main stage. Flair at that point left immediately and did not announce Tech N9ne or go back out on the main stage to announce the remaining performers. Flair's final comment before he left the main stage was "Have fun".

In 2015, Flair made his feature film debut, appearing in Magic Mike XXL. From May 2015-April 2016, Flair was host of a podcast titled "WOOOOO! Nation". The podcast was placed on hiatus after episode 46 which was uploaded on April 1, 2016. Flair returned to podcasting on MLW Radio with a new show called The Ric Flair Show in July 2016. The final episode of The Ric Flair Show was uploaded on December 16, 2016. Flair stated that the reason that he had quit the podcasting business was because he could no longer be objective when it comes to his opinion of what is happening in the WWE.

In 2017, ESPN aired Nature Boy, a 30 for 30 documentary about Flair's career directed by Rory Karpf.

On October 31, 2017, trap artists Offset and Metro Boomin released a single titled "Ric Flair Drip" from their collaborative album with 21 Savage, Without Warning, in which Flair made an appearance in the music video. In December 2017, Latin trap artist Bad Bunny released a music video entitled "Chambea", in which Flair appeared.

Flair signed an endorsement deal with online ticket exchange marketplace TickPick in August 2018. Under the agreement he would make guest posts on TickPick's blog, in addition to appearing in advertisements for the brand posted on its and his own social media channels.

Flair started appearing in an advertising campaign for CarShield in April 2021. The company paused it in September 2021 following allegations of sexual assault made by Heidi Doyle against him on an episode of Dark Side of the Ring. It however resumed airing the commercials in December 2021.

In November 2021, Flair brought back his podcast "WOOOOO! Nation". It was named "Wooooo Nation Uncensored" and was co-hosted by Mark Madden. Madden quit in March 2022. He was replaced by Flair's son-in-law Conrad Thompson and the podcast was revamped into "To Be the Man" in April 2022.

Flair signed an endorsement deal with Nu Image Medical, an online telehealth and medical company, in June 2022 to promote its men's health products. WWE and the streaming service Peacock partnered to release a documentary on Flair titled Woooooo! Becoming Ric Flair on December 26.

Business ventures

Flair sells his official merchandise through his own website.

He partnered with Scout Comics in 2021 to launch a comic book series named Code Name: Ric Flair. Following allegations of sexual assault against him made on Dark Side of the Ring, Scout Comics dropped the comic and Flair started personally selling it on his website. However later in December 2022, the company agreed to publish it through its label. The series is written by Scout Comics President James Haick III and will launch in April 2023.

In July 2022, Flair launched a virtual restaurant chain named "Wooooo! Wings" in Nashville, Tennessee in partnership with Kitchen Data Systems ahead of Ric Flair's Last Match. The name of the chain is based after Flair's signature exclamation. The food items of the outlet are prepared by KitchPartner restaurants, owned by Kitchen Data Systems. The chain expanded to six American cities in August 2022. Its launch and expansion was handled by Conrad Thompson.

Flair also partnered with Mike Tyson and Verano Holdings Corp. to launch his own cannabis line called the "Ric Flair Drip" under Tyson's cannabis brand "Tyson 2.0". The line launched in October 2022 in Arizona, Nevada and California.

 Personal life 
 Family 
Flair married his first wife, Leslie Goodman, on August 28, 1971. They had two children, daughter Megan and son David, before divorcing in 1983 after twelve years of marriage. On August 27, 1983, he married his second wife, Elizabeth Harrell. Promoter Jim Crockett Jr. served as the best man for the wedding. They had two children, daughter Ashley and son Reid. Beth and their children also made periodic appearances in WCW between 1998 and 2000. Flair and Beth divorced in 2006 after nearly 23 years of marriage. On May 27, 2006, Flair married his third wife Tiffany VanDemark, a fitness competitor. In 2008, Tiffany filed for divorce from Flair, which was finalized in 2009. On November 11, 2009, Flair married his fourth wife, Jacqueline "Jackie" Beems, in Charlotte, North Carolina. In 2012, Flair filed for divorce from Beems, which was finalized in 2014. Flair married his fifth wife, Wendy Barlow (known as Fifi, his "maid" in WCW), on September 12, 2018, at a resort in Florida. On January 31, 2022, Flair announced that he and Barlow have separated. The two have since reconciled as of May 2022.

Flair's elder son David is a retired professional wrestler, who worked for WCW from 1999 to 2001, and made two televised appearances in the WWF in 2002 during the run-up to WrestleMania X8. Flair's younger son Reid, who signed a developmental contract with WWE near the end of 2007, was an accomplished high school wrestler and made several appearances on WCW television along with his sister Ashley and half-sister Megan. In 2004, Flair became a grandfather at the age of 55, when his older daughter, Megan Fliehr Ketzner, gave birth to her first child, a daughter named Morgan Lee Ketzner on May 9. On May 17, 2012, it was reported that Flair's daughter Ashley had signed with WWE adopting the ring name, Charlotte (which was later changed to include the Flair surname). On March 29, 2013, Reid died from drug overdose of heroin, Xanax and a muscle relaxer.

 Legal problems 
In December 2005, a judge issued arrest warrants for Flair after a road rage incident that took place in Charlotte, North Carolina, in which Flair allegedly got out of his car, grabbed a motorist by the neck, and damaged his vehicle. Flair was charged with two misdemeanors, injury to personal property and simple assault and battery. This incident was ridiculed on WWE programming, most notably by the wrestler Edge.

In September 2007, Flair opened a financial business called Ric Flair Finance. In July 2008, Flair Finance filed for bankruptcy. Following Flair's debut in Total Nonstop Action Wrestling his former employer, Ring of Honor, filed a lawsuit in 2010, alleging that Flair owed them over $40,000 and that he had not appeared at several events that he was contractually obligated to appear at. The lawsuit was never resolved.

Highspots Inc. claimed that Flair had given them the NWA World Heavyweight Championship belt as collateral for the loan. A warrant for Flair's arrest was issued in May 2011 for being held in contempt of court for violating the terms of his settlement with Highspots. If Flair had failed to comply he could have potentially faced 90 days in jail. On June 25, Highspots released a statement over their official Facebook page stating that someone had paid Flair's debts.

 Politics 
Flair has long supported Republican political candidates in North Carolina politics. In 2000, Flair explored the possibility of running for governor of North Carolina, but he never filed the papers. Jesse Ventura stated that, when Flair told him that he had received 143 speeding tickets in his life, Ventura urged him not to run.

In the 2008 presidential election, Flair declared his support for the Republican presidential candidate Mike Huckabee. He said of Huckabee, "[Huckabee] is a quality person, self-made, a great family man and he has a great vision for our country. And I'm here to excite the crowd".

Flair endorsed Ted Cruz during the 2016 presidential election.

Flair announced in 2016 that he was running for president, with rapper Waka Flocka Flame as his running mate. However, he did not file a Statement of Candidacy (FEC Form 2).

Medical problems
Flair has a heart condition called alcoholic cardiomyopathy.

On August 14, 2017, Flair had surgery in Georgia to remove an obstructive piece of his bowel, which led to various complications, most seriously kidney failure, necessitating dialysis treatment and ongoing hospitalization. He was discharged from rehabilitation and allowed to return home on September 21.

 Real-life feuds and backstage problems 
Teddy Long
WWE Hall of Famer Teddy Long claimed Flair was hostile to him in his early career in the 1980s, stating "Flair walked up to me one time and asked me, he said, ‘Nigger you like working here?”. Long claims Flair never apologized to him and "hasn't changed over the years".

 Bret Hart 
Flair engaged in an off-screen rivalry with Bret Hart. In October 1993, Hart gave a radio interview in which he said Flair "sucks" and described his workplace, WCW, as "minor league". In Flair's autobiography, he accused Hart of over-exploiting the death of his brother Owen and the controversy surrounding the Montreal Screwjob. Flair also claimed in his autobiography that—despite Hart's popularity in Canada—he was not a formidable money-making draw in the United States, a claim which Hart dismissed as "plain ridiculous" in a column written for the Calgary Sun. Hart cited his headlining performances on consistently sold-out tours throughout his WWF career, while alleging that Flair wrestled to near-empty arenas. He also criticized Flair on what he perceived as insults to fellow wrestlers Mick Foley and Randy Savage, both personal friends of Hart. Hart went on to criticize Flair in his own autobiography, mainly his in-ring talent, (mis)use of ring psychology and what Hart perceived as Flair's unsubtle blading. However, they have since reconciled and are now friends.

 Shane Douglas 
Flair also had a long-running feud with Shane Douglas, who would refer to him as "Dick Flair" and accuse him of sabotaging his push in the NWA/WCW after getting a solid push and a rub from his tag team partner Ricky Steamboat. In turn, Flair responded that Douglas was always the guy that would blame his shortcomings on others. He called Douglas out as well as accused him of steroid abuse during a broadcast of the Internet radio show WCW Live! in which he said that he would meet him anytime and anywhere if he would "take the needle out of his ass".

 Mick Foley 
Flair has also had problems with Mick Foley. In his 1999 autobiography Have a Nice Day!, Foley said that "Flair was every bit as bad on the booking side of things as he was great on the wrestling side of it". This was in reference to how poorly Foley thought he was booked during his WCW career when Flair was on the booking committee. Flair responded in his autobiography by writing: "I do not care how many thumbtacks Mick Foley has fallen on, how many ladders he's fallen off, how many continents he's supposedly bled on, he will always be known as a glorified stuntman". They had an altercation in 2004 in Huntsville, and in 2006 they worked a program where Flair took part in some of the bloodiest and most violent matches of his career, particularly at SummerSlam 2006, in an "I Quit" match which had spots involving barbed wire and thumbtacks—trademark weapons from Foley's days as Cactus Jack. However, they have since reconciled and are now friends.

 Hulk Hogan 
In his book, Flair also touched on some real-life tension between himself and Hulk Hogan which largely stemmed from an incident that followed the conclusion of a tag team match between Flair and his son David and the team of Curt Hennig and Barry Windham at WCW's Souled Out pay-per-view on January 17, 1999, in Charleston, West Virginia. However, Flair has stated that he and Hogan remained friends despite their differences.

 Bruno Sammartino 
Flair and wrestler Bruno Sammartino had a real-life disagreement over what reports call "the infamous backstage snub" where Flair claims that Sammartino refused to shake his hand at a live event. While Flair claims Sammartino ignored him due to comments made in his book, stating Sammartino was "a Northeast star who couldn’t draw fans outside New York", Sammartino referred to Flair as a "liar" and stating: "No, I don't respect Ric Flair. I don't respect him at all". They reconciled and were friends until Sammartino's passing in 2018.

Becky Lynch
In September 2019, Flair threatened legal action against WWE and filed a trademark for the term "The Man", which was being used as a nickname by heavily promoted wrestler Becky Lynch. The threats of legal action caused a rift between Flair and his daughter Charlotte, who was Lynch's onscreen nemesis at the time. Lynch responded to the actions by asserting that she still liked and respected Flair. Flair transferred the rights to "The Man" nickname and gimmick to WWE in May 2020. The terms of the transfer were undisclosed. Flair began feuding with Lynch in 2021, accusing her of using the term without his explicit permission, but their dispute was resolved when he apologized to her in January 2023.

"Plane Ride from Hell"
Flair was part of the infamous 2002 "Plane Ride from Hell". Flair was accused of wearing his signature wrestling robe while naked and forcing a female flight attendant, Heidi Doyle, to touch his penis; she would later sue the WWE. The case was settled out of court; however, Flair did not face any punishment from WWE. Numerous people who were on the flight at the time, including Tommy Dreamer and Jim Ross, spoke about the incident on an episode dedicated to it on the Canadian documentary series Dark Side of the Ring in 2021. Flair released a statement after the episode aired denying the allegations. Flair was also removed from the WWE's intro signature afterwards.

 Championships and accomplishments 

 The Baltimore Sun Match of the Year (2008) International Professional Wrestling Hall of Fame
Class of 2021
 George Tragos/Lou Thesz Professional Wrestling Hall of Fame
 Class of 2013
 Mid-Atlantic Championship Wrestling/Jim Crockett Promotions/World Championship Wrestling
WCW World Heavyweight Championship (7 times)
 WCW International World Heavyweight Championship (2 times)
 NWA Mid-Atlantic Heavyweight Championship (3 times)
 NWA (Mid Atlantic)/NWA Television Championship (2 times)
 NWA (Mid Atlantic)/WCW United States Heavyweight Championship (6 times)
 NWA Mid-Atlantic Tag Team Championship (3 times) – with Rip Hawk (1), Greg Valentine (1), and Big John Studd (1)
 NWA World Tag Team Championship (Mid-Atlantic version) (3 times) – with Greg Valentine (2) and Blackjack Mulligan (1)
 First WCW Triple Crown Champion
 National Wrestling Alliance
NWA World Heavyweight Championship (10 times)
 NWA Hall of Fame (class of 2008)
 Pro Wrestling Illustrated Feud of the Year (1987) The Four Horsemen vs. The Super Powers and The Road Warriors
 Feud of the Year (1988, 1990)  vs. Lex Luger
 Feud of the Year (1989) vs. Terry Funk
 Inspirational Wrestler of the Year (2008)
 Match of the Year (1983) vs. Harley Race (June 10)
 Match of the Year (1984) vs. Kerry Von Erich at Parade of Champions 1
 Match of the Year (1986) vs. Dusty Rhodes at The Great American Bash in a steel cage match
 Match of the Year (1989) vs. Ricky Steamboat at WrestleWar
 Match of the Year (2008) vs. Shawn Michaels at WrestleMania XXIV
 Match of the Decade (2000–2009) vs. Shawn Michaels at WrestleMania XXIV
 Most Hated Wrestler of the Year (1978, 1987)
 Rookie of the Year (1975)
 Stanley Weston Award (2008)
 Wrestler of the Year (1981, 1984–1986, 1989, 1992)
PWI Wrestler of the Decade (1980's)
 Ranked No. 3 of the top 500 wrestlers in the PWI 500 in 1991, 1992, and 1994
 Ranked No. 2 of the top 500 singles wrestlers of the PWI Years in 2003
 Professional Wrestling Hall of Fame and Museum
 Class of 2006
 St. Louis Wrestling Club
 NWA Missouri Heavyweight Championship (1 time)
 St. Louis Wrestling Hall of Fame
 Class of 2007
 World Wrestling Federation/Entertainment/WWE
World Tag Team Championship (3 times) – with Batista (2) and Roddy Piper (1)
 WWE Intercontinental Championship (1 time)
WWF World Heavyweight Championship (2 times)
Royal Rumble (1992)
Thirteenth Triple Crown Champion
Slammy Award for Match of the Year (2008) 
WWE Hall of Fame (2 times)
 Class of 2008 - individually
 Class of 2012 -  as a member of The Four Horsemen
WWE Bronze Statue (2017)
 Wrestling Observer Newsletter''
 Best Heel (1990)
 Best Interviews (1991, 1992, 1994)
 Hardest Worker (1982,1984-1988)
 Feud of the Year (1989) vs. Terry Funk 
 Match of the Year (1983) vs. Harley Race in a steel cage match at Starrcade
 Match of the Year (1986) vs. Barry Windham at Battle of the Belts II on February 14
 Match of the Year (1988) vs. Sting at Clash of the Champions I 
 Match of the Year (1989) vs. Ricky Steamboat at Clash of the Champions VI: Ragin' Cajun
 Most Charismatic (1980, 1982–1984, 1993)
 Most Outstanding (1986, 1987, 1989)
 Readers' Favorite Wrestler (1984–1993, 1996)
 Worst Feud of the Year (1990) vs. The Junkyard Dog
 Worst Worked Match of the Year (1996) with Arn Anderson, Meng, The Barbarian, Lex Luger, Kevin Sullivan, Z-Gangsta, and The Ultimate Solution vs. Hulk Hogan and Randy Savage in a Towers of Doom match at Uncensored
 Wrestler of the Year (1982–1986, 1989, 1990, 1992)
 Most Disgusting Promotional Tactic (1994) Retirement angle
 Wrestling Observer Newsletter Hall of Fame (Class of 1996)

Notes

References

Further reading

External links 

 
 
 
 

1949 births
20th-century professional wrestlers
21st-century professional wrestlers
American adoptees
American male professional wrestlers
American male writers
American podcasters
Anderson family
Living people
Masked wrestlers
North Carolina Republicans
NWA/WCW World Television Champions
NWA/WCW/WWE United States Heavyweight Champions
NWA World Heavyweight Champions
People from Beaver Dam, Wisconsin
Professional wrestlers from North Carolina
Professional wrestlers from Tennessee
Professional wrestling authority figures
Professional Wrestling Hall of Fame and Museum
Professional wrestling managers and valets
Professional wrestling podcasters
Professional wrestling trainers
Professional wrestling writers
Sportspeople from Charlotte, North Carolina
Sportspeople from Minneapolis
Survivors of aviation accidents or incidents
The Four Horsemen (professional wrestling) members
The Heenan Family members
WCW World Heavyweight Champions
WWE Hall of Fame inductees
WWF/WWE Intercontinental Champions
WWE Champions
Wayland Academy, Wisconsin alumni
University of Minnesota alumni
WCW World Tag Team Champions